Waterhead may refer to more than one place in England:
Waterhead, Carlisle, a civil parish in North Cumbria
Waterhead, Greater Manchester, a district of Oldham
Waterhead, South Lakeland, part of Ambleside, Cumbria, with pier on Windermere

See also
Headwater